Catena Media is a publicly-listed media company. The company was founded in 2012 and employs 500 people in Malta, the United Kingdom, Serbia, Italy, Germany, Sweden, the United States, Australia and Japan.

History

In 2008, childhood friends Erik Bergman and Emil Thidell opened a web consultancy agency. For the first two years, the business operated from Thidell's parents’ basement. In October 2010, the pair decided to move to Malta. In 2012, they established Catena Media, with a focus on lead generation for online gambling operators.

In 2013, Catena Media began rapidly expanding, entering the Norwegian, Finnish and Swedish markets. In October 2014, the company completed its first acquisition of the company Finix Invest, and in 2015, acquired eight more companies in the UK, Netherlands and Belgium. The number of company employees reached 50 by the end of 2015. The first quarter of 2017 revenues totalled EUR 15.23 million (7.46), an increase of 104 per cent compared with the same quarter of the previous year.

Websites

AskGamblers.com
Catena Media acquired the website AskGamblers.com in April 2016 for €15 million (US$17.1 million). AskGamblers is one of Catena Media's largest websites, which features a player complaints resolution service. Players lodge disputes with the website, which then gives the relevant operator an opportunity to respond. Through the AskGamblers Casino Complaint Service, $26 million of delayed, unfairly confiscated and otherwise unpaid money has been returned to over 9,873 players in total as of 2015.

Other websites
Catena Media acquired i15Media in December 2016. In late 2016 the company also acquired two British websites - SBAT.com, a sports statistics and betting tips website, for €13 million and CasinoUK.com, for US$13.38 million.

In April 2017, Catena Media relaunched casino comparison site JohnSlots.com. In December, it was announced that Catena Media had purchased Squawka, a football news website which had been going through financial difficulties, for $1.3 million. Catena Media had also acquired Baybets Ltd. that month.

In March 2018, Catena Media acquired US-based BonusSeeker.com. In July 2018, Catena Media closed the acquisition of the premium forex industry news website LeapRate.com.

References

Digital marketing companies
Companies listed on Nasdaq Stockholm
Multinational companies headquartered in Malta
Companies established in 2012
2012 establishments in Malta